The BN-600 reactor is a sodium-cooled fast breeder reactor, built at the Beloyarsk Nuclear Power Station, in Zarechny, Sverdlovsk Oblast, Russia. Designed to generate electrical power of 600 MW in total, the plant dispatches 560 MW to the Middle Urals power grid. It has been in operation since 1980 and represents an evolution on the preceding BN-350 reactor. In 2014, its larger sister reactor, the BN-800 reactor began operation.

The plant is a pool type LMFBR, where the reactor, coolant pumps, intermediate heat exchangers and associated piping are all located in a common liquid sodium pool. This is essentially the same general design as EBR-II, which went into service in 1963. The reactor system is housed in a concrete rectilinear building, and provided with filtration and gas containment features. In the first 15 years of operation, there have been 12 incidents involving sodium/water interactions from tube breaks in the steam generators, a sodium-air oxidation/"fire" from a leak in an auxiliary system, and a sodium "fire" from a leak in a secondary coolant loop while shut down. All these incidents were classified at the lowest level on the International Nuclear Event Scale, and none of the events prevented restarting operation of the facility after repairs. As of 1997, there had been 27 sodium leaks, 14 of which resulted in sodium-air oxidations/"fires". The steam generators are separated in modules so they can be repaired without shutting down the reactor. As of 2020, the cumulative "energy Availability factor" calculated up to year 2019 and recorded by the IAEA was 75.6%.

The reactor core is 1.03 meters tall with a diameter of 2.05 meters. It has 369 fuel assemblies, mounted vertically, each consisting of 127 fuel rods enriched to between 17–26% 235U. In comparison, normal enrichment in other Russian reactors is between 3–4% 235U. The control and scram system comprises 27 reactivity control elements including 19 shimming rods, two automatic control rods, and six automatic emergency shut-down rods. On-power refueling equipment allows for charging the core with fresh fuel assemblies, repositioning and turning the fuel assemblies within the reactor, and changing control and scram system elements remotely.

The unit employs a three-circuit coolant arrangement; sodium coolant circulates in both the primary and secondary circuits. Water and steam flow in the third circuit. The sodium is heated to a maximum of 550 °C in the reactor during normal operations. This heat is transferred from the reactor core via three independent circulation loops. Each comprises a primary sodium pump, two intermediate heat exchangers, a secondary sodium pump with an expansion tank located upstream, and an emergency pressure discharge tank. These feed a steam generator, which in turn supplies a condensing turbine that turns the generator.

There is much international interest in the fast-breeder reactor at Beloyarsk. Japan has its own prototype fast-breeder reactors. Japan paid 1 billion for the technical documentation of the BN-600. The operation of the reactor is an international study in progress; Russia, France, Japan, and the United Kingdom currently participate.

The reactor has been licensed to operate up to 2025.

See also

Generation IV reactor

References

External links
 Rosenergoatom the Reactor BN-600
 Overview of Fast Reactors in Russia and the Former Soviet Union
 BN-600 Hybrid Core Benchmark Analyses (IAEA TECDOC 1623)
 BN-600 Fuel (Russian firm that produces fuel for the BN-600)
 Liquid Metal Cooled Reactors: Experience in Design and Operation (IAEA TECDOC 1529)
 Operating experience from the BN600 sodium fast reactor, IAEA
 Assessment of changes to the BN-600 to operate with a plutonium burner core 

Liquid metal fast reactors
Nuclear power in Russia
Nuclear technology in the Soviet Union
Soviet inventions
1980 in the Soviet Union

de:BN-Reaktor#BN-600